Fidel Corrales Jimenez is an American chess Grandmaster.

Chess career
In 2009 Jimenez shared first place with Alexander Shabalov in the American Continental Chess Championship.

He played in the Chess World Cup 2009 and Chess World Cup 2011, in both cases representing the Cuban Chess Federation, being defeated by Alexander Areshchenko and Judit Polgár, respectively, in the first rounds.

References

External links 

1987 births
Living people
American chess players
Chess grandmasters
Place of birth missing (living people)